The 1986 Notre Dame Fighting Irish football team represented the University of Notre Dame in the 1986 NCAA Division I-A football season. The team was coached by Lou Holtz and played its home games at Notre Dame Stadium in South Bend, Indiana.

Schedule

Roster

Game summaries

Michigan

On September 13, 1986, Notre Dame lost to No. 3 Michigan, 24–23, before a crowd of 59,075 at Notre Dame Stadium in South Bend, Indiana. The game was the first for Lou Holtz as Notre Dame's head coach.

On the game's opening possession, Michigan mounted a six-and-a-half-minute drive to the Notre Dame 25-yard line, but Pat Moons missed a 42-yard field goal. After Michigan's touchdown, Notre Dame drove 75 yards on 13 plays, capped by a three-yard touchdown run by flanker Tim Brown. On its second possession, Michigan followed with an 80-yard, eight-play drive, fueled by a 34-yard catch by John Kolesar, and capped by an eight-yard touchdown run by Jamie Morris.

On Notre Dame's second possession, the Irish again drove downfield, but Reggie Ward fumbled at Michigan's six-yard line, and Michigan recovered the loose ball. Notre Dame's defense held, and Michigan was forced to punt from its own end zone. Monte Robbins' punt was good for only 23 yards, and Notre Dame took over at Michigan's 26-yard line. Eight plays later, Mark Green scored on a one-yard run. After Green's touchdown, Jim Harbaugh led the Wolverines on a seven-minute, 75-yard, 13-play drive, and Pat Moons kicked a 23-yard field goal. Notre Dame led, 14-10, at halftime.

Michigan moved ahead in the third quarter. On the opening drive of the second half, Harbaugh led the Wolverines on a 78-yard, 12-play drive ending with a one-yard touchdown run by Morris. On the kickoff following the touchdown, the kick hit a Notre Dame player and bounced loose with free safety Doug Mallory recovering the ball at the Notre Dame 27-yard line. On the next play from scrimmage, Harbaugh threw a touchdown pass to Morris, and Michigan led 24-14.

On its next possession, Steve Beuerlein led the Irish on a 66-yard, 12-play touchdown drive ending with a two-yard pass from Beuerlein to Joel Williams. John Carney's extra point kick failed, and Michigan led, 24-20, at the end of the third quarter.

In the fourth quarter, Notre Dame drove 62 yards in 10 plays, and a 25-yard field goal by John Carney brought the Irish within one point with 4:26 remaining in the game. Then, with 1:33 remaining in the game, Michigan fullback Bob Perryman fumbled at the Notre Dame 26-yard line, and Notre Dame linebacker Wesley Pritchett recovered the loose ball. Beuerlein quickly led the Irish to Michigan's 28-yard line. With 13 seconds remaining, Carney's 45-yard field goal attempt went wide to the left.

Notre Dame out-gained Michigan, 455 yards to 393 yards. For the Irish, Steve Beuerlein completed 21 of 33 passes for 263 yards, at touchdown, and an interception, and Tim Brown rushed for 65 yards on 12 carries. For the Wolverines, Harbaugh completed 15 of 23 passes for 239 yards and a touchdown, Kolesar caught four passes for 93 yards, and Morris rushed for 77 yards and two touchdowns on 23 carries. Michigan forced four turnovers, including two fumble recoveries by Doug Mallory and a fourth-quarter interception by David Arnold in the end zone. Andy Moeller led the Michigan defense with seven solo tackles and six assists.

at Michigan State

Purdue

at Alabama

Pittsburgh

Air Force

Navy

SMU

Penn State

at LSU

at USC

Source:

Team players drafted into the NFL
The following players were drafted into professional football following the season.

References

Notre Dame
Notre Dame Fighting Irish football seasons
Notre Dame Fighting Irish football